Love and Co is a 1998 Brazilian-Portuguese comedy-drama film directed by Helvécio Ratton. Based on Eça de Queiroz's novel Alves & Cia, it stars Marco Nanini, Patricia Pillar and Alexandre Borges. Shot in São João Del Rei, Minas Gerais, and set in the 19th century, it follows Alves (Nanini) as he finds his wife Ludovina (Pillar) with Machado (Borges), and challenges him for a gun duel.

Cast
Marco Nanini as Alves
Patricia Pillar as Ludovina
Alexandre Borges as Machado
Rogério Cardoso as Neto
Cláudio Mamberti as Carvalho
Ary França as Medeiros
Maria Sílvia as Margarida
Nelson Dantas as Asprígio
Rui Resende as Abílio
Sônia Siqueira as Joana

Reception
Love and Co grossed R$237,310 and was watched by 47,179 people in the 24 Brazilian theaters in which it was released. It was nominated for the 1st Grande Prêmio Cinema Brasil for Best Film and Best Actor (Marcos Nanini), but lost in both categories. It was awarded as the Best Iberoamerican Film at the 14th Mar del Plata Film Festival. At the 31st Festival de Brasília, it won the Best Film, Best Actress (Patricia Pillar), and shared the Best Art Direction (Clóvis Bueno and Vera Hamburger) with Kenoma. Marco Nanini won Best Actor while Tavinho Moura won Best Music at the 3rd Brazilian Film Festival of Miami.

References

External links

Amor & Cia at Cinemateca Brasileira
Amor & Cia at Rosa Filmes

1998 films
1998 comedy-drama films
Brazilian comedy-drama films
Films based on works by Eça de Queirós
Films directed by Helvécio Ratton
Films set in the 19th century
Films shot in Minas Gerais
Portuguese comedy-drama films
1990s Portuguese-language films